José Medel (June 21, 1938 - January 31, 2001), sometimes introduced as Joe Medel, was a Mexican boxer in the Featherweight division. He was one of the most popular boxers from Mexico.

Professional career
Medel was born in Mexico City, Mexico. In August 1959, he beat José Toluco López to win the Mexican Bantamweight Championship.

WBA World bantamweight title
His first world title shot was in Brazil against the WBA champion Eder Jofre, Medel would go on to lose the bout.

WBC & WBA World bantamweight titles
In his next title fight, Medel lost a fifteen round decision to Fighting Harada in Japan the country of the champion.

Professional boxing record 

|- style="margin:0.5em auto; font-size:95%;"
| style="text-align:center;" colspan="8"|69 Wins (44 knockouts, 25 decisions), 31 Losses (10 knockouts, 20 decisions, 1 disqualification), 8 Draws
|- style="text-align:center; margin:0.5em auto; font-size:95%; background:#e3e3e3;"
| style="border-style:none none solid solid; "|Res.
| style="border-style:none none solid solid; "|Record
| style="border-style:none none solid solid; "|Opponent
| style="border-style:none none solid solid; "|Type
| style="border-style:none none solid solid; "|Round
| style="border-style:none none solid solid; "|Date
| style="border-style:none none solid solid; "|Location
| style="border-style:none none solid solid; "|Notes
|-align=center
| Loss
|69–31–8
|align=left| Royal Kobayashi
|align=left|RTD
|6 (10)
|1974-06-09
|align=left| Korakuen Hall, Tokyo, Japan
|align=left|
|-align=center
| Loss
|69–30–8
|align=left| Adalides Munoz
|align=left|KO
|4 (10)
|1973-09-29
|align=left| Acapulco, Mexico
|align=left|
|-align=center
| Win
|69–29–8
|align=left| Miguel Hernandez
|align=left|TKO
|6 (10)
|1972-04-18
|align=left| Auditorio Matamoros, Matamoros, Mexico
|align=left|
|-align=center
| Loss
|68–29–8
|align=left| Salvador Martinez Carillo
|align=left|PTS
|10
|1972-01-21
|align=left| Arena Coliseo, Guadalajara, Mexico
|align=left|
|-align=center
| Loss
|68–28–8
|align=left| Jose Luis Meza
|align=left|PTS
|10
|1971-03-27
|align=left| Arena México, Mexico City, Mexico
|align=left|
|-align=center
| Loss
|68–27–8
|align=left| Efren Torres
|align=left|KO
|4 (10)
|1970-10-31
|align=left| Arena Coliseo, Guadalajara, Mexico
|align=left|
|-align=center
| Win
|68–26–8
|align=left| Benito Estrella
|align=left|TKO
|3 (10)
|1970-09-05
|align=left| Arena México, Mexico City, Mexico
|align=left|
|-align=center
| Win
|67–26–8
|align=left| Ubaldo Duarte
|align=left|PTS
|10
|1970-04-11
|align=left| Arena México, Mexico City, Mexico
|align=left|
|-align=center
| Win
|66–26–8
|align=left| Misao Yamane
|align=left|TKO
|3 (10)
|1969-11-28
|align=left| Plaza Nuevo Progreso, Guadalajara, Mexico
|align=left|
|-align=center
| Draw
|65–26–8
|align=left| Chucho Castillo
|align=left|PTS
|12
|1969-09-30
|align=left| Ciudad Juárez, Mexico
|align=left|For Mexican bantamweight title
|-align=center
| Loss
|65–26–7
|align=left| Kazuyoshi Kanazawa
|align=left|PTS
|10
|1969-08-07
|align=left| Tokyo, Japan
|align=left|
|-align=center
| Win
|65–25–7
|align=left| Shigeyoshi Oki
|align=left|UD
|10
|1969-06-10
|align=left| Plaza de Toros, Ciudad Juárez, Mexico
|align=left|
|-align=center
| Loss
|64–25–7
|align=left| Rubén Olivares
|align=left|KO
|8 (10)
|1968-11-24
|align=left| Estadio Universitario, Monterrey, Mexico
|align=left|
|-align=center
| Loss
|64–24–7
|align=left| Lionel Rose
|align=left|PTS
|10
|1968-08-28
|align=left| The Forum, Inglewood, California, U.S.
|align=left|
|-align=center
| Win
|64–23–7
|align=left| Evan Armstrong
|align=left|PTS
|10
|1968-03-31
|align=left| El Toreo de Cuatro Caminos, Mexico City, Mexico
|align=left|
|-align=center
| Draw
|63–23–7
|align=left| Masataka Uno
|align=left|PTS
|10
|1968-02-07
|align=left| Nagoya, Japan
|align=left|
|-align=center
| Loss
|63–23–6
|align=left| Efren Torres
|align=left|PTS
|10
|1967-10-07
|align=left| Arena Coliseo, Guadalajara, Mexico
|align=left|
|-align=center
| Loss
|63–22–6
|align=left| Chucho Castillo
|align=left|UD
|12
|1967-04-29
|align=left| Arena México, Mexico City, Mexico
|align=left|Lost Mexican bantamweight title
|-align=center
| Loss
|63–21–6
|align=left| Fighting Harada
|align=left|UD
|15
|1967-01-03
|align=left| Aichi Prefectural Gymnasium, Nagoya, Japan
|align=left|For WBA, WBC, The Ring, and lineal bantamweight titles
|-align=center
| Win
|63–20–6
|align=left| Hiroshi Otomori
|align=left|TKO
|7 (10)
|1966-10-22
|align=left| El Toreo de Cuatro Caminos, Mexico City, Mexico
|align=left|
|-align=center
| Win
|62–20–6
|align=left| Rudy Corona
|align=left|TKO
|6 (10)
|1966-06-21
|align=left| Sports Arena, Los Angeles, California, U.S.
|align=left|
|-align=center
| Win
|61–20–6
|align=left| Jesús Pimentel
|align=left|UD
|10
|1965-12-06
|align=left| Sports Arena, Los Angeles, California, U.S.
|align=left|
|-align=center
| Win
|60–20–6
|align=left| Walter McGowan
|align=left|TKO
|6 (10)
|1965-06-01
|align=left| Empire Pool, London, England
|align=left|
|-align=center
| Win
|59–20–6
|align=left| Katsuo Saito
|align=left|UD
|10
|1965-05-13
|align=left| Nihon University Auditorium, Tokyo, Japan
|align=left|
|-align=center
| Win
|58–20–6
|align=left| Vicente Garcia
|align=left|KO
|9 (12)
|1965-04-03
|align=left| Arena México, Mexico City, Mexico
|align=left|Retained Mexican bantamweight title
|-align=center
| Win
|57–20–6
|align=left| Ray Asis
|align=left|KO
|3 (10)
|1964-09-26
|align=left| El Toreo de Cuatro Caminos, Mexico City, Mexico
|align=left|
|-align=center
| Win
|56–20–6
|align=left| Manuel Galvez
|align=left|PTS
|10
|1964-07-10
|align=left| Tampico, Mexico
|align=left|
|-align=center
| Loss
|55–20–6
|align=left| Ray Asis
|align=left|SD
|10
|1964-04-18
|align=left| Araneta Coliseum, Quezon City, Philippines
|align=left|
|-align=center
| Win
|55–19–6
|align=left| Manuel Barrios
|align=left|PTS
|12
|1963-11-30
|align=left| El Toreo de Cuatro Caminos, Mexico City, Mexico
|align=left|Retained Mexican bantamweight title
|-align=center
| Draw
|54–19–6
|align=left| Tetsuro Kawai
|align=left|PTS
|10
|1963-10-17
|align=left| Kumamoto, Japan
|align=left|
|-align=center
| Win
|54–19–5
|align=left| Fighting Harada
|align=left|TKO
|6 (10)
|1963-09-26
|align=left| Tokyo, Japan
|align=left|
|-align=center
| Draw
|53–19–5
|align=left| Manuel Barrios
|align=left|PTS
|12
|1963-08-17
|align=left| Ciudad Juárez, Mexico
|align=left|Retained Mexican bantamweight title
|-align=center
| Loss
|53–19–4
|align=left| Manuel Barrios
|align=left|PTS
|10
|1963-04-21
|align=left| Ciudad Juárez, Mexico
|align=left|
|-align=center
| Win
|53–18–4
|align=left| Edmundo Esparza
|align=left|TKO
|3 (12)
|1963-02-02
|align=left| Mexico City, Mexico
|align=left|Retained Mexican bantamweight title
|-align=center
| Loss
|52–18–4
|align=left| Éder Jofre
|align=left|KO
|6 (15)
|1962-09-11
|align=left| Ginásio do Ibirapuera, São Paulo, Brazil
|align=left|For WBA, The Ring, and lineal bantamweight titles
|-align=center
| Win
|52–17–4
|align=left| Sadao Yaoita
|align=left|PTS
|10
|1962-03-29
|align=left| Tokyo, Japan
|align=left|
|-align=center
| Win
|51–17–4
|align=left| Ignacio Pina
|align=left|TKO
|11 (12)
|1961-11-04
|align=left| Arena México, Mexico City, Mexico
|align=left|Retained Mexican bantamweight title
|-align=center
| Win
|50–17–4
|align=left| Haruo Sakamoto
|align=left|PTS
|10
|1961-10-17
|align=left| Tokyo, Japan
|align=left|
|-align=center
| Win
|49–17–4
|align=left| Mitsunori Seki
|align=left|PTS
|5 (10)
|1961-08-31
|align=left| Tokyo, Japan
|align=left|
|-align=center
| Win
|48–17–4
|align=left| Felix Gutierrez
|align=left|PTS
|7 (10)
|1961-07-29
|align=left| Mexico City, Mexico
|align=left|
|-align=center
| Win
|47–17–4
|align=left| Hector Agundez
|align=left|PTS
|4 (10)
|1961-06-18
|align=left| Mexicali, Mexico
|align=left|
|-align=center
| Win
|46–17–4
|align=left| Herman Leyva Marques
|align=left|SD
|12
|1961-03-21
|align=left| Freeman Coliseum, San Antonio, Texas, U.S.
|align=left|Won North American bantamweight title
|-align=center
| Draw
|45–17–4
|align=left| Hiram Bacallao
|align=left|PTS
|10
|1961-02-25
|align=left| Arena México, Mexico City, Mexico
|align=left|
|-align=center
| Win
|45–17–3
|align=left| José Toluco López
|align=left|TKO
|7 (10)
|1960-11-19
|align=left| Mexico City, Mexico
|align=left|Originally a Mexican bantamweight title bout, but López missed weight.
|-align=center
| Win
|44–17–3
|align=left| Manny Elias
|align=left|PTS
|10
|1960-10-15
|align=left| Nuevo Laredo, Mexico
|align=left|
|-align=center
| Loss
|43–17–3
|align=left| Éder Jofre
|align=left|KO
|10 (12)
|1960-08-18
|align=left| Olympic Auditorium, Los Angeles, California, U.S.
|align=left|
|-align=center
| Win
|43–16–3
|align=left| Eloy Sanchez
|align=left|PTS
|12
|1960-07-23
|align=left| Mexico City, Mexico
|align=left|Retained Mexican bantamweight title
|-align=center
| Win
|42–16–3
|align=left| Monito Luna
|align=left|KO
|8 (10)
|1960-06-09
|align=left| Puebla, Mexico
|align=left|
|-align=center
| Win
|41–16–3
|align=left| Danny Kid
|align=left|UD
|10
|1960-04-09
|align=left| Mexico City, Mexico
|align=left|
|-align=center
| Win
|40–16–3
|align=left| Toto Ibarra
|align=left|KO
|3 (10)
|1960-02-20
|align=left| Mexico City, Mexico
|align=left|
|-align=center
| Loss
|39–16–3
|align=left| Eloy Sanchez
|align=left|PTS
|10
|1959-12-19
|align=left| Arena Coliseo, Guadalajara, Mexico
|align=left|
|-align=center
| Loss
|39–15–3
|align=left| Ignacio Pina
|align=left|PTS
|10
|1959-11-16
|align=left| Tijuana, Mexico
|align=left|
|-align=center
| Loss
|39–14–3
|align=left| Danny Kid
|align=left|SD
|12
|1959-09-24
|align=left| Olympic Auditorium, Los Angeles, California, U.S.
|align=left|For North American bantamweight title
|-align=center
| Win
|39–13–3
|align=left| Pimi Barajas
|align=left|KO
|7 (10)
|1959-09-12
|align=left| Monterrey, Mexico
|align=left|
|-align=center
| Win
|38–13–3
|align=left| José Toluco López
|align=left|PTS
|12
|1959-08-01
|align=left| Mexico City, Mexico
|align=left|Won Mexican bantamweight title
|-align=center
| Win
|37–13–3
|align=left| Javier Garfias
|align=left|TKO
|8 (10)
|1959-07-04
|align=left| Arena Coliseo, Guadalajara, Mexico
|align=left|
|-align=center
| Win
|36–13–3
|align=left| Antonio Rosales
|align=left|TKO
|8 (10)
|1959-06-20
|align=left| Arena Coliseo, Guadalajara, Mexico
|align=left|
|-align=center
| Win
|35–13–3
|align=left| Hector Agundez
|align=left|KO
|5 (10)
|1959-05-01
|align=left| Mexicali, Mexico
|align=left|
|-align=center
| Win
|34–13–3
|align=left| Johnny Sarduy
|align=left|KO
|3 (10)
|1959-04-25
|align=left| Mexico City, Mexico
|align=left|
|-align=center
| Win
|33–13–3
|align=left| Mario de Leon
|align=left|UD
|12
|1959-01-29
|align=left| Olympic Auditorium, Los Angeles, California, U.S.
|align=left|
|-align=center
| Loss
|32–13–3
|align=left| Boots Monroe
|align=left|UD
|10
|1959-01-08
|align=left| Olympic Auditorium, Los Angeles, California, U.S.
|align=left|
|-align=center
| Win
|32–12–3
|align=left| Ross Padilla
|align=left|TKO
|7 (10)
|1958-10-30
|align=left| Olympic Auditorium, Los Angeles, California, U.S.
|align=left|
|-align=center
| Win
|31–12–3
|align=left| Eduardo Guerrero
|align=left|KO
|6 (10)
|1958-10-11
|align=left| Mexico City, Mexico
|align=left|
|-align=center
| Loss
|30–12–3
|align=left| Carlos Cardoso
|align=left|PTS
|10
|1958-08-23
|align=left| Monterrey, Mexico
|align=left|
|-align=center
| Win
|30–11–3
|align=left| Dwight Hawkins
|align=left|KO
|7 (10)
|1958-06-28
|align=left| Mexico City, Mexico
|align=left|
|-align=center
| Win
|29–11–3
|align=left| Jose Luis Mora
|align=left|PTS
|10
|1958-05-24
|align=left| El Toreo de Cuatro Caminos, Mexico City, Mexico
|align=left|
|-align=center
| Loss
|28–11–3
|align=left| Carlos Cardoso
|align=left|PTS
|10
|1958-04-26
|align=left| Acapulco, Mexico
|align=left|
|-align=center
| Loss
|28–10–3
|align=left| Miguel Lazu
|align=left|KO
|4 (10)
|1958-03-22
|align=left| Mexico City, Mexico
|align=left|
|-align=center
| Loss
|28–9–3
|align=left| José Becerra
|align=left|PTS
|10
|1958-02-08
|align=left| Mexico City, Mexico
|align=left|
|-align=center
| Win
|28–8–3
|align=left| Eduardo Guerrero
|align=left|PTS
|10
|1958-01-11
|align=left| Mexico City, Mexico
|align=left|
|-align=center
| Win
|27–8–3
|align=left| David Rodriguez
|align=left|KO
|9 (10)
|1957-12-07
|align=left| Monterrey, Mexico
|align=left|
|-align=center
| Win
|26–8–3
|align=left| Raul Leanos
|align=left|KO
|4 (10)
|1957-11-23
|align=left| Monterrey, Mexico
|align=left|
|-align=center
| Win
|25–8–3
|align=left| David Rodriguez
|align=left|PTS
|10
|1957-10-30
|align=left| Mexico City, Mexico
|align=left|
|-align=center
| Loss
|24–8–3
|align=left| Mario de Leon
|align=left|PTS
|10
|1957-09-07
|align=left| Arena México, Mexico City, Mexico
|align=left|
|-align=center
| Loss
|24–7–3
|align=left| David Rodriguez
|align=left|PTS
|10
|1957-08-05
|align=left| Reynosa, Mexico
|align=left|
|-align=center
| Win
|24–6–3
|align=left| Chucho Gonzalez
|align=left|KO
|9 (10)
|1957-07-01
|align=left| Reynosa, Mexico
|align=left|
|-align=center
| Win
|23–6–3
|align=left| Mario Ruiz
|align=left|TKO
|8 (10)
|1957-05-11
|align=left| Mexico City, Mexico
|align=left|
|-align=center
| Win
|22–6–3
|align=left| Kildo Martinez
|align=left|KO
|10
|1957-04-13
|align=left| Mexico City, Mexico
|align=left|
|-align=center
| Win
|21–6–3
|align=left| Percy Lightburn
|align=left|KO
|4 (10)
|1957-03-23
|align=left| Acapulco, Mexico
|align=left|
|-align=center
| Loss
|20–6–3
|align=left| José Becerra
|align=left|PTS
|10
|1957-03-02
|align=left| Mexico City, Mexico
|align=left|
|-align=center
| Loss
|20–5–3
|align=left| José Becerra
|align=left|PTS
|10
|1957-02-09
|align=left| Monterrey, Mexico
|align=left|
|-align=center
| Win
|20–4–3
|align=left| Roque Fernandez
|align=left|KO
|9 (10)
|1957-01-12
|align=left| Mexico City, Mexico
|align=left|
|-align=center
| Win
|19–4–3
|align=left| Mike Garcia
|align=left|KO
|2 (10)
|1956-12-15
|align=left| Acapulco, Mexico
|align=left|
|-align=center
| Win
|18–4–3
|align=left| Chuy Guerrero
|align=left|PTS
|10
|1956-11-22
|align=left| Plaza de Toros, Torreón, Mexico
|align=left|
|-align=center
| Loss
|17–4–3
|align=left| Jose Luis Mora
|align=left|KO
|8 (10)
|1956-10-31
|align=left| Mexico City, Mexico
|align=left|
|-align=center
| Win
|17–3–3
|align=left| Cheto Fernandez
|align=left|KO
|3 (10)
|1956-10-06
|align=left| Mexico City, Mexico
|align=left|
|-align=center
| Win
|16–3–3
|align=left| Jorge Herrera
|align=left|KO
|8 (10)
|1956-09-11
|align=left| Arena Progresso, Guadalajara, Mexico
|align=left|
|-align=center
| Draw
|15–3–3
|align=left| Roque Fernandez
|align=left|PTS
|10
|1956-08-15
|align=left| Mexico City, Mexico
|align=left|
|-align=center
| Win
|15–3–2
|align=left| Ernesto Castaneda
|align=left|KO
|8 (10)
|1956-07-11
|align=left| Mexico City, Mexico
|align=left|
|-align=center
| Win
|14–3–2
|align=left| Mike Cruz
|align=left|KO
|2 (10)
|1956-06-30
|align=left| Arena México, Mexico City, Mexico
|align=left|
|-align=center
| Win
|13–3–2
|align=left| Juancito Lopez
|align=left|PTS
|8
|1956-05-26
|align=left| Mexico City, Mexico
|align=left|
|-align=center
| Win
|12–3–2
|align=left| Roque Fernandez
|align=left|KO
|3 (8)
|1956-05-13
|align=left| Acapulco, Mexico
|align=left|
|-align=center
| Win
|11–3–2
|align=left| Tony Alamillo
|align=left|KO
|2 (8)
|1956-04-28
|align=left| Mexico City, Mexico
|align=left|
|-align=center
| Win
|10–3–2
|align=left| Fili Maya
|align=left|KO
|1 (8)
|1956-04-11
|align=left| Mexico City, Mexico
|align=left|
|-align=center
| Win
|9–3–2
|align=left| Juancito Lopez
|align=left|PTS
|8
|1956-03-21
|align=left| Mexico City, Mexico
|align=left|
|-align=center
| Win
|8–3–2
|align=left| Daniel Silva
|align=left|KO
|7 (8)
|1956-02-29
|align=left| Mexico City, Mexico
|align=left|
|-align=center
| Loss
|7–3–2
|align=left| Roberto Mar
|align=left|KO
|9 (10)
|1955-12-17
|align=left| Acapulco, Mexico
|align=left|
|-align=center
| Draw
|7–2–2
|align=left| Roberto Mar
|align=left|PTS
|8
|1955-12-03
|align=left| Acapulco, Mexico
|align=left|
|-align=center
| Win
|7–2–1
|align=left| Eleazar Gonzalez
|align=left|KO
|2 (8)
|1955-11-19
|align=left| Arena Coliseo, Mexico City, Mexico
|align=left|
|-align=center
| Win
|6–2–1
|align=left| Zurdo Arce
|align=left|KO
|2 (8)
|1955-11-05
|align=left| Acapulco, Mexico
|align=left|
|-align=center
| Win
|5–2–1
|align=left| Juan Alcantara
|align=left|KO
|2 (8)
|1955-10-22
|align=left| Mexico City, Mexico
|align=left|
|-align=center
| Loss
|4–2–1
|align=left| Zurdo Arce
|align=left|DQ
|1 (6)
|1955-10-01
|align=left| Acapulco, Mexico
|align=left|
|-align=center
| Draw
|4–1–1
|align=left| Daniel Silva
|align=left|PTS
|6
|1955-09-21
|align=left| Arena Coliseo, Mexico City, Mexico
|align=left|
|-align=center
| Win
|4–1
|align=left| Salvador Mora
|align=left|KO
|5 (6)
|1955-08-24
|align=left| Mexico City, Mexico
|align=left|
|-align=center
| Win
|3–1
|align=left| Carlos Olivares
|align=left|PTS
|6
|1955-07-20
|align=left| Arena Coliseo, Mexico City, Mexico
|align=left|
|-align=center
| Win
|2–1
|align=left| Antonio Coria
|align=left|PTS
|4
|1955-06-18
|align=left| Arena Coliseo, Mexico City, Mexico
|align=left|
|-align=center
| Win
|1–1
|align=left| Mario Gabarro
|align=left|PTS
|4
|1955-06-04
|align=left| Mexico City, Mexico
|align=left|
|-align=center
| Loss
|0–1
|align=left| Heriberto Fuentas
|align=left|KO
|3 (4)
|1955-03-19
|align=left| Mexico City, Mexico
|align=left|
|-align=center

References

External links

Boxers from Mexico City
Super-featherweight boxers
1938 births
2001 deaths
Mexican male boxers